Cláudio Hummes, OFM (born Auri Alfonso Hummes; 8 August 1934 – 4 July 2022) was a Brazilian prelate of the Catholic Church. He was prefect of the Congregation for the Clergy from 2006 to 2010, having served as Archbishop of Fortaleza from 1996 to 1998 and Archbishop of São Paulo from 1998 to 2006. A member of the Order of Friars Minor and an outspoken proponent of social justice, he was made a cardinal in 2001.

Biography

Early life and education 
Hummes was born Auri Alfonso Hummes in the village of Batinga Sul to Pedro Adão Hummes, a German-Brazilian, and Maria Frank, a German. Taking the name Cláudio upon his profession as a Franciscan, he was ordained to the priesthood on 3 August 1958 by Archbishop João Resende Costa. He obtained a doctorate in philosophy in 1963 from the Pontifical University Antonianum in Rome.

From 1963 until 1968, he taught philosophy at the Franciscan seminary in Garibaldi, the major seminary of Viamão, and at the Pontifical Catholic University of Porto Alegre. He then studied at the Ecumenical Institute of Bossey in Geneva, Switzerland, where he received a specialization in ecumenism. He was adviser for ecumenical affairs to the Episcopal Conference of Brazil, Provincial Superior of the Franciscans of Rio Grande do Sul (1972–1975), and president of the Union of Latin American Conferences of Franciscans.

Along with his native Portuguese and Riograndenser Hunsrückisch, a regional German dialect of southern Brazil, he could also speak Standard German, French, Spanish, and Italian.

Bishop
On 22 March 1975, he was appointed Coadjutor Bishop of Santo André and Titular Bishop of Carcabia. Hummes received his episcopal consecration on the following 25 May from Archbishop Aloísio Lorscheider, OFM, with Bishops Mauro Morelli and Urbano Allgayer serving as co-consecrators. He succeeded Jorge de Oliveira as Bishop of Santo André on 29 December of that same year. Hummes allowed the labour unions to meet in parishes throughout his diocese, going against the dictatorship in Brazil at the time. It was here that he began his support for liberation theology, and forged his friendship with the union boss at the time, Luiz Inácio Lula da Silva. On 29 May 1996 he was promoted to Archbishop of Fortaleza and was then transferred to São Paulo on 15 April 1998.

Cardinal 
Hummes was created Cardinal-Priest of S. Antonio da Padova in Via Merulana by Pope John Paul II in the consistory of 21 February 2001. He later preached the Lenten spiritual exercises for John Paul II and the Roman Curia in 2002. One of the cardinal electors who participated in the 2005 papal conclave that selected Pope Benedict XVI, Hummes was often mentioned as a possible successor to Pope John Paul II.

Hummes was a member of Congregation for Divine Worship and the Discipline of the Sacraments, Congregation for the Doctrine of the Faith, Congregation for Bishops, Congregation for Catholic Education, Pontifical Council for the Laity, Pontifical Council for the Family, Pontifical Council Cor Unum, Pontifical Council for Interreligious Dialogue, Pontifical Council for Culture, Pontifical Commission for Latin America, X Ordinary Council of the General Secretariat of the Synod of Bishops, Council of Cardinals for the Study of Organizational, and Prefecture for the Economic Affairs of the Holy See.

On 31 October 2006, Pope Benedict XVI appointed Hummes to head the Congregation for the Clergy. He accepted his resignation from that post on 7 October 2010.

In 2013 he served as one of the 115 cardinals in the conclave that elected Pope Francis. When the new pope won the conclave ballot, Hummes whispered to him, "Don't forget the poor". Francis said that immediately he remembered Francis of Assisi, "the man of poverty, the man of peace, the man who loves and protects creation," and "the name Francis came into my heart".  When Francis appeared on the balcony shortly after his election, Hummes was among the cardinals who accompanied the new pope and stood beside him at his immediate left on the balcony.

A year later, Hummes was appointed honorary president of the Pan-Amazonian Ecclesial Network (REPAM), established in 2014 in Brasilia, Brazil, during a meeting of bishops whose territories include Amazon regions, priests, missionaries of congregations who work in the Amazon jungle, and national representatives of Caritas and laypeople belonging to various Church bodies. In his message, he reiterated that the creation of the Pan-Amazon Ecclesial Network "represents a new incentive and relaunch of the work of the Church in Amazonia, strongly desired by the Holy Father. There, the Church wishes to be, with courage and determination, a missionary Church, merciful, prophetic, and close to all the people, especially the poorest, the excluded, the discarded, the forgotten and wounded. A Church with an 'Amazonian face' and a 'native clergy', as Pope Francis proposed in his address to the bishops of Brazil".

Death 
Hummes died at his home in São Paulo on 4 July 2022 following a bout of lung cancer.  He was 87.

Climate activism 

On 29 November 2015, ahead of the 2015 United Nations Climate Change Conference Cardinal Hummes appeared again on the world's global media stage when he and Avaaz campaigner Oscar Soria displayed a pair of shoes donated by Pope Francis to support a climate demonstration in Paris that had replaced a planned march after French authorities had banned public protests in the aftermath of the November 2015 Paris attacks. Parisians and others from around the world donated shoes and set them up at Place de la Republique, in a symbolic march organized by the civic movement Avaaz which gained the support of the pope.

"This is a very important and also very emotional moment, the Pope wanted to personally participate symbolically just like all of us who have put our shoes, we want to participate symbolically to the worldwide march for climate change here in Paris", Cardinal Hummes told journalists at the event.

"We ask for drastic cuts of carbon emissions to keep the global temperature rise below the dangerous threshold of 1.5 °C," the cardinal said before international media. "As the bishops' appeal states, we need to 'put an end to the fossil fuel era' and 'set a goal for complete decarbonisation by 2050 (...) And we ask wealthier countries to aid the world's poorest to cope with climate change impacts, by providing robust climate finance," he added.

Recounting that event, Cardinal Hummes later said: "I had the privilege, along with Oscar Soria from Avaaz, to bring the shoes of Pope Francis. There were lots of expectations, it was a great and symbolically strong way of pressure from the people, and as well the presence of Pope Francis, in this clamor to avert climate change".

Views

Economic issues
Cardinal Hummes who criticized the spread of global capitalism,  claimed that privatizing state companies and lowering tariffs had contributed to "misery and poverty affecting millions around the world".

Indigenous people
Hummes issued an official statement condemning the anonymous attacks on homeless indigenous people. He said "such violence and cruelty is unacceptable and should be vigorously repudiated. The Church has cried out many times regarding the need to come to the aid of those who are forced to live in our streets, without shelter.  She does so out of a duty of humanity and because of her faith in Jesus Christ, who wishes to be identified in each person, especially in the poor and handicapped".

Clerical celibacy
In a 2006 interview with Brazilian newspaper O Estado de S. Paulo, Cardinal Hummes said that "even though celibacy is part of Catholic history and culture, the Church could review this question, because celibacy is not a dogma but a disciplinary question." He also said that it is "a long and valuable tradition in the Latin-rite church, based on strong theological and pastoral arguments".

Contraception

Hummes reprimanded priests who attack Catholic teachings about condoms.

Published works

References

External links
 
 Catholic-Pages Biography of Cardinal Hummes
 Cláudio Hummes' biography at Salvador Miranda's  The Cardinals of the Holy Roman Church website

1934 births
2022 deaths
People from Rio Grande do Sul
Brazilian people of German descent
Brazilian cardinals
21st-century Roman Catholic archbishops in Brazil
20th-century Roman Catholic archbishops in Brazil
Prefects of the Congregation for the Clergy
Members of the Congregation for Divine Worship and the Discipline of the Sacraments
Members of the Congregation for the Doctrine of the Faith
Members of the Congregation for Bishops
Members of the Congregation for Catholic Education
Pontifical Council Cor Unum
Members of the Pontifical Council for Culture
Cardinals created by Pope John Paul II
Franciscan cardinals
Roman Catholic archbishops of Fortaleza
Roman Catholic archbishops of São Paulo
Roman Catholic bishops of Santo André